Alin Alexuc-Ciurariu (born February 3, 1990) is an amateur Romanian Greco-Roman wrestler, who competes in the men's heavyweight category. He won one of the bronze medals in the 130 kg event at the 2022 World Wrestling Championships held in Belgrade, Serbia. He is a member of CS Botoşani for the wrestling division, and is coached and trained by Victor Baciu.

Alexuc-Ciurariu represented Romania at the 2012 Summer Olympics in London, where he competed in the men's 96 kg class. He lost the qualifying match to Albanian-born Bulgarian wrestler Elis Guri, who was able to score one point each in two straight periods, leaving Alexuc-Ciurariu without a single point.

At the 2016 Summer Olympics, he beat Hamdy El-Said before losing to Artur Aleksanyan in the quarter final.  As Aleksanyan reached the final, Alexuc-Ciurariu was entered into the repechage, where he beat Daigoro Timoncini in a shut out, before losing in his bronze medal match to Cenk İldem.

At the 2018 European Championships, he competed in the 130 kg division.  He beat Stepan David and Mantas Knystautas before losing to Rıza Kayaalp.  As Kayaalp reached the final, Alexuc-Ciurariu was entered into the repechage.  There, he won his bronze medal match against Bálint Lám.

In March 2021, he competed at the European Qualification Tournament in Budapest, Hungary hoping to qualify for the 2020 Summer Olympics in Tokyo, Japan. He competed in the men's 130 kg event.

In 2022, he competed in the 130 kg event at the European Wrestling Championships in Budapest, Hungary.

References

External links
 
 
 
 

Romanian male sport wrestlers
1990 births
Living people
Olympic wrestlers of Romania
Wrestlers at the 2012 Summer Olympics
Wrestlers at the 2016 Summer Olympics
Wrestlers at the 2020 Summer Olympics
Sportspeople from Botoșani
Wrestlers at the 2015 European Games
Wrestlers at the 2019 European Games
European Games competitors for Romania
European Wrestling Champions
World Wrestling Championships medalists
20th-century Romanian people
21st-century Romanian people